The Yo-Yo intermittent test is aimed at estimating performance in stop-and-go sports like football (soccer), cricket, basketball and the like. It was conceived around the early 1990s by Jens Bangsbo, a Danish soccer physiologist, then described in a 2008 paper, "The Yo-Yo Intermittent Recovery Test". Like many other tests of fitness, it involves running at ever-increasing speeds, to exhaustion. However, a crucial difference is that the Yo-Yo Intermittent test has periodic rest intervals, thus simulating the nature of exertion in stop-and-go sports.

The four tests 
There are four versions of the Yo-Yo Intermittent test:
 Recovery Level 1 (Yo-Yo IR1). This is the most popular version focusing "on the capacity to carry out intermittent exercise leading to a maximal activation of the aerobic system".
 Recovery Level 2 (Yo-Yo IR2). This is a tougher version of "Recovery Level 1". It "determines an individual's ability to recover from repeated exercise with a high contribution from the anaerobic system."
 Endurance Level 1 (Yo-Yo IE1). This may be used to test participants in less vigorous sports that usually last longer.
 Endurance Level 2 (Yo-Yo IE2). This is a tougher version of "Endurance Level 1".

The tests, described below, are largely similar to each other in principle. Coaches and individuals are free to select the one that best suits their sport and the individuals they are training.

Basic features

Set-up 

All tests use the same 25-meter track (shown). Markers are placed at 0, 5 and 25 meters on a flat surface that has suitable traction to allow for significant acceleration and deceleration.

Procedure 
The set-up for all four versions is identical. Prior to the test commencing, runners line up at the 5 m marker, facing the 25 m marker. Following a countdown, a double beep signals the start.

 Runners commence running towards the 25 m marker
 At or before the following beep, runners must reach the 25 m marker. Touching with a single foot is acceptable
 At or after, but not before, the same beep, runners commence running back to the 5 m marker
 At or before the next beep, runners must reach back to the 5 m marker
 The rest period now commences: 10 seconds in the Recovery tests, 5 seconds in the Endurance tests. Runners stroll to the 0 m marker, then return to the 5 m marker
 A beep indicates the end of the rest period and the start of the next circuit (back to Step 1)

After a predetermined number of circuits at a speed level (which varies with each version of the test), the speed level changes. This is signaled, usually, by a double beep or, possibly, a voice cue. The required speed at the new speed level will be faster.

Video of the Recovery Level 1 test

Scoring 
A runner who fails to reach the relevant marker in time is cautioned; if they want to continue, they must touch the marker before turning back. Two consecutive failures terminates their attempt. Their most recent successful circuit is marked as their score.

Scoring is usually done using "Speed Level.Circuits" terminology; for example, 15.2, which means "completed 2 circuits at level 15". Alternatively, scores may be recorded as distance; for example, 840 m. The two methods correlate exactly, meaning that given one, it is possible to determine the other (see the tables below).

Note that scores in one version of the test do not correlate with scores in other versions. That is, a score of 15.2 in Yo-Yo IR1 is not the same as 15.2 in Yo-Yo IR2.

Recovery Level 1 (Yo-Yo IR1) 
Yo-Yo IR1 appears to be the most popular test, primarily because it is a considered a good indicator of the aerobic capacity of athletes in intermittent sports.

Note: A circuit consists of running two shuttles followed by a 10 second rest period

Table derived from "The Yo-Yo Intermittent Tests: A Systematic Review and Structured Compendium of Test Results" and ESPNCricinfo

As a side note, "Speed Level" correlates exactly with "Running Speed (km/h)" using the formula: (Running Speed – 7.5) * 2. This applies to all versions of the test.

Recovery Level 2 (Yo-Yo IR2) 
The Yo-Yo IR2 test is usually used to evaluate elite level athletes, specifically aimed at determining the athlete's ability to perform well in the aerobic and anaerobic spectrum.

Note: A circuit consists of running two shuttles followed by a 10 second rest period

Table derived from "The Yo-Yo Intermittent Tests: A Systematic Review and Structured Compendium of Test Results"

Endurance Level 1 (Yo-Yo IE1) 

Note: A circuit consists of running two shuttles followed by a 5 second rest period

Table derived from "The Yo-Yo Intermittent Tests: A Systematic Review and Structured Compendium of Test Results"

Endurance Level 2 (Yo-Yo IE2) 

Note: A circuit consists of running two shuttles followed by a 5 second rest period

Notable records:
Ryan Ferguson - completed 2009. 21.12
Table derived from "The Yo-Yo Intermittent Tests: A Systematic Review and Structured Compendium of Test Results"

Yo-Yo tests and VO2 max 
VO2 max, or milliliters of oxygen per kilogram of body mass per minute (e.g., mL/(kg·min)), is considered an excellent proxy for aerobic fitness. Consequently, attempts have been made to correlate Yo-Yo test scores with VO2 max. There are conflicting reports about such a correlation. Two studies  reported only a weak correlation. Another study reported strong correlation (R2=0.89) but the author acknowledged that most previous studies showed weak correlation.

Formula 
There are sources that have published formulae for the relationship:

Yo-Yo IR1:  VO2max = (Final distance (in meters) × 0.0084) + 36.4

Yo-Yo IR2:  VO2max = (Final distance (in meters) × 0.0136) + 45.3

However, an eyeball review indicates minimum scores for Yo-Yo IR1 and Yo-Yo IR2 of 36.4 and 45.3 respectively—that is, the score if the runner does not complete a single circuit. Both scores are reasonably respectable VO2 max scores; clearly, the formulae apply with additional caveats (which are not mentioned).

Yo-Yo IR1 standards 
A selection of standards, across sports, from around the world.
Note that these may be affected by selection bias. An open-access publication on reference values for different sports and activity levels for individuals > 16 years of age has been published in 2018. A reference list for children is also available

Women

Men

See also 

 Multi-stage fitness test
 Harvard step test, a cardiovascular test

References 

Fitness tests
Physical exercise
Sprint (running)